Ludwigia is an extinct genus of ammonites in the family Graphoceratidae, which lived during the Middle Jurassic.

Species
L. murchisonae Sowerby, 1825, which has an elaborate ribbing and a strong ridge along the dorsal surface of the shell.

Distribution
Fossils of Ludwigia murchisonae are found in the Jurassic marine strata of France, Germany, Hungary, Spain and the United Kingdom.

References

External links
 Biolib
 Encyclopaedia of Life

Middle Jurassic ammonites of Europe
Aalenian life
Hildoceratoidea
Ammonitida genera